Ryad Assani-Razaki (born November 4, 1981) is a Beninese-Canadian writer. His debut short story collection Deux cercles won the Trillium Book Award for French-language fiction in 2010, and his novel La main d'Iman won the Prix Robert-Cliche in 2011 and was shortlisted for the Governor General's Award for French-language fiction in 2012.

Born in Cotonou, Benin, Assani-Razaki first moved to North America in 1999, to study computer science at the University of North Carolina. After graduating in 2002, he struggled to find a job until registering for a master's in computer science at the Université de Montréal in 2004. He wrote his first short story in 2006, after witnessing an Asian man struggle to order food in a fast food restaurant because of his difficulties with the language. Deux cercles was published in 2009.

References

21st-century Canadian novelists
21st-century Canadian short story writers
Black Canadian writers
Beninese emigrants to Canada
Canadian male novelists
Canadian male short story writers
Canadian novelists in French
Canadian short story writers in French
Writers from Toronto
Living people
People from Cotonou
Beninese novelists
Beninese male short story writers
Beninese short story writers
1981 births
University of North Carolina alumni
Université de Montréal alumni
21st-century Canadian male writers